Decaturia is a monotypic snout moth genus (family Pyralidae). Its only species, Decaturia pectinalis, is found from California to southern Arizona. Both the genus and species were described by William Barnes of Decatur, Illinois, and James Halliday McDunnough in 1912.

The wingspan is about 13 mm.

References

Cacotherapiini
Monotypic moth genera
Moths of North America
Pyralidae genera